The Greece women's national beach handball team is the national team of Greece. It takes part in international beach handball competitions.

World Championships results
2018 – 1st place
2022 – 4th place

Mediterranean Beach Games 

 2015 - 2nd place (Silver medal)
 2019 - 1st place (Gold medal)

References

External links
Official website
IHF profile

Women's national beach handball teams
Beach handball